The following genera that are commonly called "thick-toed" geckos:

 Chondrodactylus, a genus of geckos
 Elasmodactylus, a small genus of geckos from Africa
 Pachydactylus, a genus of insectivorous geckos endemic to Africa